Daskalgram railway station is a railway station in the Ahmadpur–Katwa line under the Howrah railway division of the Eastern Railway zone. It is situated in Daskalgram, Birbhum district in the Indian state of West Bengal.

History
The Ahmedpur–Katwa narrow-gauge railway line connecting Ahmedpur and Katwa was established on 29 September 1917 by McLeod's Light Railways. Indian Railways took over the operation of this narrow-gauge railway from McLeod and Company in 1966. After closing the line in 2013, the railway section was converted into  broad gauge. The conversion work started in 2013 and was completed in early 2017. The track, including Daskalgram railway station, was reopened to the public on 24 May 2018.

References

Railway stations in Birbhum district
Howrah railway division
1917 establishments in India